Patrick Bona (born February 14, 1981) is an Italian ice hockey player. He is currently playing with the HC Falcons Brixen-Bressanone of the Italian Hockey League.

International
Bona was named to the Italy national ice hockey team for competition at the 2014 IIHF World Championship.

References

External links

1981 births
Living people
Brest Albatros Hockey players
Italian ice hockey right wingers
HC Merano players
HC Pustertal Wölfe players
Ritten Sport players
Ice hockey people from Bolzano
Wipptal Broncos players